Jürgen Melzer and Iveta Benešová were the defending champions, but after receiving a first-round bye, lost in the second round to Dominic Inglot and Laura Robson.

Mike Bryan and Lisa Raymond defeated Leander Paes and Elena Vesnina in the final, 6–3, 5–7, 6–4 to win the mixed doubles tennis title at the 2012 Wimbledon Championships.

Seeds
All seeds received a bye into the second round. 

  Bob Bryan /   Liezel Huber (semifinals)
  Mike Bryan /   Lisa Raymond (champions)
  Nenad Zimonjić /   Katarina Srebotnik (semifinals)
  Leander Paes /   Elena Vesnina (final)
  Mahesh Bhupathi /   Sania Mirza (second round)
  Daniele Bracciali /   Roberta Vinci (third round)
  Aisam-ul-Haq Qureshi /   Andrea Hlaváčková (second round)
  Daniel Nestor /   Julia Görges (quarterfinals)
  Mariusz Fyrstenberg /   Abigail Spears (second round)
  Rohan Bopanna /   Zheng Jie (quarterfinals)
  František Čermák /   Lucie Hradecká (withdrew)
  Jürgen Melzer /   Iveta Benešová (second round)
  Fabio Fognini /   Sara Errani (second round)
  David Marrero /   Nuria Llagostera Vives (second round)
  Andy Ram /   Květa Peschke (third round)
  Alexander Peya /   Anna-Lena Grönefeld (third round)

Draw

Finals

Top half

Section 1

Section 2

Bottom half

Section 3

Section 4

References

External links

2012 Wimbledon Championships on WTAtennis.com
2012 Wimbledon Championships – Doubles draws and results at the International Tennis Federation

X=Mixed Doubles
Wimbledon Championship by year – Mixed doubles